= Le Monde doit m'arriver =

Le Monde doit m’arriver (2012) or Find the Way is a French feature film shot in Marseille in 2010 and finalized in 2012. This is the first feature film of Jonathan Taieb as director.

== Synopsis ==
Ludo, an almost-30-year-old wistful artist, finds his life turned upside down after a potentially serious health problem, a break-up, and after meeting Raphael, a child doomed by an incurable disease.

== Cast ==
- Alex Skarbek
- Jeremy Taieb
- Sabrina Nouchi
- Rozenn Djonkovitch
- Gildas Saublet
- Georges Martin-Censier
- Jackie Joseph
